Moses Elias Kiley (November 13, 1876 – April 15, 1953) was a Canadian-born prelate of the Catholic Church. He served as the bishop of the Diocese of Trenton in New Jersey (1934–1940) and the Archbishop of the Archdiocese of Milwaukee in Wisconsin (1940–1953).

Biography

Early life 
Moses Kiley was born on November 13, 1876, in Margaree, on Cape Breton Island in Nova Scotia, to John and Margaret (née McGarry) Kiley. He received his early education at a grade school in Baddeck, Nova Scotia.  When Kiley was 16, the family immigrated to the United States, moving Somerville, Massachusetts. He financed his higher education by working as an errand boy at a carriage shop in Somerville established by his older brothers. He also worked as a floorwalker at a department store in Boston and as a trolley motorman.

In 1903, Kiley enrolled at the College of St. Laurent in Montreal, Quebec. After three years in Montreal, he began his studies for the priesthood at St. Mary's Seminary in Baltimore, Maryland, in 1906. The following year, Kiley was sent to Rome, where he resided at the Pontifical North American College. While in Rome, he earned a doctorate in philosophy from the Pontificial University of St. Thomas in 1909, and a doctorate in theology from the Pontifical Urban University in 1911.

Priesthood 
Kiley was ordained a priest for the Archdiocese of Chicago in Rome on June 10, 1911. Following his return to the United States, he was assigned as a curate at St. Agnes Parish in Chicago, Illinois, where he remained for five years. In 1916, he established the Mission of the Holy Cross for homeless men. That same year, he was named the first archdiocesan director of Catholic Charities, a post which he held until 1926.Kiley was elevated to the rank of monsignor in 1924. From 1926 to 1934, he served as spiritual director of the Pontifical North American College in Rome.

Bishop of Trenton 
On February 10, 1934, Kiley was appointed the fifth bishop of the Diocese of Trenton by Pope Pius XI. He received his episcopal consecration on  March 17, 1934, from Cardinal Raffaele Rossi, with Cardinal Carlo Salotti and Archbishop Thomas Walsh serving as co-consecrators, at the Church of Santa Susanna in Rome. His most notable achievement in Trenton was refinancing $10,000,000 of church obligations.

Archbishop of Milwaukee 
Following the transfer of Archbishop Samuel Stritch to the Archdiocese of Chicago, Kiley was appointed the sixth archbishop of the Archdiocese of Milwaukee by Pope Pius XII on January 1, 1940. Kiley was installed at the Church of the Gesu in Milwaukee on March 28, 1940.

During his tenure in Milwaukee, Kiley earned a reputation as a conservative leader and stern administrator. He oversaw an extensive renovation of the Cathedral of St. John the Evangelist in Milwaukee, which suffered major damage from a fire in 1935. He rebuilt the St. Aemillian Orphanage in Milwaukee, which had also suffered major fire damage in the 1930s. Kiley also renovated St. Francis Seminary in St. Francis, Wisconsin, converted Pio Nono High School into a minor seminary, and created a Catholic Family Life Bureau in 1948.

Moses Kiley died on April 15, 1953, at St. Mary's Hospital in Milwaukee, at age 76.

See also

 Catholic Church hierarchy
 Catholic Church in the United States
 Historical list of the Catholic bishops of the United States
 List of Catholic bishops of the United States
 Lists of patriarchs, archbishops, and bishops

References

External links
Official site of the Holy See

1876 births
1953 deaths
20th-century Roman Catholic archbishops in the United States
Roman Catholic archbishops of Milwaukee
Canadian emigrants to the United States
People from Baddeck, Nova Scotia
People from Inverness County, Nova Scotia
People from Somerville, Massachusetts
Roman Catholic Archdiocese of Milwaukee
Roman Catholic bishops of Trenton
St. Mary's Seminary and University alumni
Catholics from Massachusetts